The Baltimore Chamber Orchestra is a mid-sized orchestral ensemble based in and around Baltimore, Maryland.

History
The orchestra's first performance was on January 29, 1984, under the baton of Anne Harrigan, with the orchestra  focusing in its initial years on the "core" classical era of Haydn, Mozart, Beethoven, Mendelssohn and Schubert.

People
Markand Thakar became music director in 2004; he has led the orchestra at performances in China and New York, among other locations.

Jonathan Leshnoff joined the orchestra as composer-in-residence in 2007.

Guest performers and soloists with the orchestra have included Zlatomir Fung, Katherine Needleman and Madeline Adkins.

See also
Baltimore Symphony Orchestra
Concert Artists of Baltimore
Baltimore Philharmonia
Peabody Institute

References

Musical groups from Baltimore
Musical groups established in 1984
Orchestras based in Maryland